Charly Lownoise & Mental Theo were a DJ duo from the Netherlands. They are best known for their successful happy hardcore songs, but have also produced gabber records.

History
Charly Lownoise was born as Ramon Roelofs on June 16, 1968 in The Hague in South Holland and was later member of Starsplash. Mental Theo was born Theo Nabuurs on February 14, 1965 in 's-Hertogenbosch, North Brabant. Their more popular tracks include "Wonderful Days" (which samples Help Get Me Some Help by Tony Ronald), "Stars" and "Live At London". The song "Revolution" is played after AZ scores a goal at home. They played their final show together on  Saturday July 30, 2022 at the Ziggo Dome in Amsterdam.

Discography

Albums
 Charlottenburg (1995) - Urban
 Old School Hardcore (1996) - Polydor
 On Air (1996) - Polydor
 Thank You Ravers (CD + DVD) (2005) -  EMI Music (Netherlands)
 Speedcity - The Greatest Hits (2006) - Sony BMG Music Entertainment (Netherlands)

Compilations
 Kiss Your Sweet Ears Goodbye!! (1998) - Master Maximum Records
 Speedcity (2xCD + DVD) (2003) - BMG (Netherlands)

Singles
 "Flight to Frankfurt" (1993) - Master Maximum Records
 "Holland" (1993) - Master Maximum Records
 "Tiroler Kaboemsch" (1993) - Total Recall
 "The Bird" (1993)- Hard Stuff Records
 "Kiss the Ground" (1994) - Master Maximum Records
 "Live at London" (1994) - Master Maximum Records 	
 "Wonderful Days" (1994) - Polydor
 "Stars" (1995) - Urban
 "The Bird" (1995) - ZYX Music
 "This Christmas" (1995) - Urban
 "Together in Wonderland" (1995) - Polydor
 "Fantasy World" (1996) - Polydor
 "Hardcore Feelings" (1996) - Polydor
 "Fantasy World / Stars" (1996) - Polydor
 "In the Mix" (1996) - Warner Special Marketing GmbH
 "Party" (1996) - Urban
 "Streetkids" (1996) - Urban
 "Your Smile" (1996) - Polydor
 "Just Can't Get Enough" (1997) - Polydor
 "Next 2 Me" (1998) - Polydor
 "Girls" (2000) - Polydor
 "Wonderful Days" (2001) - Kontor Records
 "Wonderfull Days / Is There Anybody Out There" (2001) - Bang On!
 "Speedcity Megamix" (2004) -	BMG (Netherlands)
 "All I Wanna Do Is F*ck with the DJ" (2007) - Master Maximum Records
 "DJ Fuck / Tiroler Kaboemsch / Ultimate Sextrack / Verrotted" (2007) - VIP Records
 "Live at London / 1,2,3 for Germany / The Bird / Rebel" (2007) - VIP Records
 "Wonderful Days 2.08" (2007) - Master Maximum Records
 "Wonderfull Days / Wonderfull Days / Motherfuck / Speedcity" (2007) - VIP Records
 "Koning voetbal dit ek" (feat. Wesley Sneijder) (2021) - Cloud 9 Recordings
 "Last Goodbye" (2022) - Collect! Music Publishers

EPs
 Blast EP (1993) - Master Maximum Records
 Tears EP (1993) - Master Maximum Records
 Party EP (1996) - Master Maximum Trance Traxx

External links
 Website Charly Lownoise
 Discogs Profile
 Charly Lownoise at Discogs.com
 Mental Theo on Discogs.com
 The Final Show Charlie Lownoise and Mental Theo

Dutch dance music groups
Happy hardcore musicians